Filograna implexa is a species of polychaetes belonging to the family Serpulidae.

The species has almost cosmopolitan distribution.

References

Annelids